Eduard Oswald (born 1947 in Augsburg) is a German politician who served as one of the vice presidents of the German Bundestag from 2011 until 2013. A member of the Christian Social Union, he was nominated by the CDU/CSU parliamentary faction to succeed Gerda Hasselfeldt.

Political career

A member of the CSU since 1966, he was a deputy in the Augsburg county council from 1972 to 1998 and a member of the Bavarian Landtag from 1978 to 1986.    

From 1987 until 2013, Oswald was a directly elected member of the Bundestag, representing the constituency of Augsburg-Land in Bavaria. He was a member of the executive committee of the CDU/CSU parliamentary group in the Bundestag and served as its parliamentary secretary from May 1992 to January 1998. In the last Kohl cabinet, he was Federal Minister for Regional Planning, Building and Urban Development. During his tenure before his election as Vice President of the Bundestag he served on several important committees including transport, economics and technology and finance.

Other activities
 Augsburg University of Applied Sciences, member of the board of trustees

References

1947 births
Living people
Members of the Bundestag for Bavaria
Members of the Landtag of Bavaria
Politicians from Augsburg
Members of the Bundestag 2009–2013
Members of the Bundestag 2005–2009
Members of the Bundestag 2002–2005
Members of the Bundestag 1998–2002
Members of the Bundestag 1994–1998
Members of the Bundestag 1990–1994
Members of the Bundestag for the Christian Social Union in Bavaria